Théodore Bernard "Théo" Mendy (born 18 July 1990) is a Senegalese footballer who most recently played as a forward for Turkish club Keçiörengücü.

Club career
He made his professional debut in the Segunda Liga for Desportivo das Aves on 22 August 2015 in a game against Portimonense.

References

External links

1990 births
Footballers from Dakar
Living people
Senegalese footballers
Sporting Clube da Praia players
Senegalese expatriate footballers
Expatriate footballers in Cape Verde
Boavista F.C. players
AD Oliveirense players
Expatriate footballers in Portugal
C.D. Aves players
Liga Portugal 2 players
Association football forwards
Expatriate footballers in Turkey
Senegalese expatriate sportspeople in Turkey
Senegalese expatriate sportspeople in Portugal